Ricker Dome is a snow-free summit, 1,720 m, standing 3 nautical miles (6 km) east of Smith Bluff in the Nash Range. Mapped by the United States Geological Survey (USGS) from tellurometer surveys and Navy air photos, 1960–62. Named by Advisory Committee on Antarctic Names (US-ACAN) for Karl E. Ricker, United States Antarctic Research Program (USARP) biologist at McMurdo Sound, 1961.
 

Mountains of the Ross Dependency
Shackleton Coast